A Hog-Eye in Missouri is a small compact place sunk in a hollow.  There were once several places in Missouri called Hog-Eye:

  Hog-Eye in Vernon County, Missouri, renamed Nevada in 1855
  Hog-Eye in Saint Francois County, Missouri, renamed Haggai in 1890, although it still retained its old pronunciation
  Hog-Eye in Wayne County, Missouri, renamed Lowndes
  Hog-Eye in Dallas County, Missouri, renamed Charity
  Hogeye, Texas in Hunt County, Texas
  Hogeye, Arkansas, near Fayetteville, Arkansas
  Hogeye, California, former name of Keyesville, California
  Hog Eye, West Virginia

Other uses for Hog-Eye or Hogeye include:
  The Hogeye Marathon and Relays, held in Fayetteville, Arkansas
  The Hogeye Festival, held in Elgin, Texas
  Hogeye, a children's novel by Susan Meddaugh
  A Hog-Eye was distinctive flat-bottom boat or barge used in the shallow waters surrounding San Francisco Bay during the California Gold Rush, named from the dismissive name 'ditch-hog' applied to rivermen by deep-water sailors
  The term "hog-eye" was used in early blues songs as a euphemism for the female genitalia

See also
 Pig's Eye (disambiguation)